Eupithecia bandurriasae is a moth in the family Geometridae. It is found the Region of Campo (Coihaique Province) in Chile. The habitat consists of the Valdivian Forest Biotic Province.

The length of the forewings is about 8.5 mm for females. Adults have been recorded on wing in December.

References

Moths described in 1991
bandurriasae
Moths of South America
Endemic fauna of Chile